The following is a list of Chicago Maroons men's basketball head coaches.  The Chicago Maroons men's basketball team has had 11 head coaches.  The current coach is Mike McGrath.

Source

The National Invitation Tournament began in 1938.
The NCAA Men's Division I Basketball Championship began in 1939.
The NCAA Men's Division III Basketball Championship began in 1975.

*Chicago left the Big Ten Conference at the conclusion of the 1945-46 season.  They joined the Midwest Conference in 1976, followed by entering the University Athletic Association in 1987.

References

Chicago

Chicago Maroons basketball, men's, coaches